The 1973 USA Outdoor Track and Field Championships men's competition took place between June 15–17 at Memorial Stadium on the campus of Bakersfield College in Bakersfield, California. This was Bakersfield's third and last time to host the men's division in a sequence every three years since 1967. At this time, Memorial Stadium still had a finely crushed brick surface, the last time the championships was held on a dirt track. They would host the women's division the following year, as they had in 1971. This was also the last time the men's division would compete at imperial distances (though the women would continue for another year). The women's division held their championships separately a little over a hundred fifty miles south at Anteater Stadium on the campus of University of California, Irvine in Irvine, California.

Results

Men track events

Men field events

Women track events

Women field events

See also
United States Olympic Trials (track and field)

References

 Results from T&FN
 results

USA Outdoor Track and Field Championships
Usa Outdoor Track And Field Championships, 1973
Track and field
Track and field in California
Outdoor Track and Field Championships
Outdoor Track and Field Championships
Sports competitions in California